The 1919 Belmont Stakes was the 51st running of the Belmont Stakes. It was the 13th Belmont Stakes held at Belmont Park in Elmont, New York and was held on June 11, 1919. With a field of only three horses, heavily favored Sir Barton won the 1 –mile race (11 f; 2.2 km) by 5 lengths over Sweep On.

By winning the Belmont, Sir Barton became the first horse to win the Kentucky Derby, the Preakness Stakes, and the Belmont Stakes -- a feat which would later become known as the "Triple Crown."

Sir Barton's time of 2:17.4 set an American record for 1 –mile.

Results

References

External links 
BelmontStakes.com

Belmont Stakes races
Belmont Stakes
Belmont Stakes
Belmont Stakes